On the Cobbles was the final studio album by John Martyn released during his lifetime (his last studio album, Heaven and Earth, was released posthumously), released in 2004. The album was recorded at various studios in Ireland, the UK and US including Woolengrange in Ireland; The Toolshed, Chicago USA; Doon The Cellar, Birkenhead; Swan Yard Studios, London; Parr Street Studios, Liverpool; Hornyold Road Studios, Worcestershire and at The Caliope Recorders, Chicago, USA. It features guest appearances from Paul Weller, Nick McCabe, and long-time collaborator Danny Thompson.

The album was dedicated to "the surgical team & nurses of Orthopaedic Ward One at Waterford Hospital, Waterford, Ireland."

Track listing
All tracks composed by John Martyn except where indicated.

"Baby Come Home" (Frankie Miller) – 3:28
"Under My Wing" – 4:10
"Ghosts" – 4:03
"Back to Marseilles" – 4:20
"Cobbles" – 3:52
"My Creator" – 7:17
"One for the Road" – 4:05
"Go Down Easy" – 4:57
"Walking Home" – 4:49
"Goodnight Irene" (Lead Belly, John Lomax) – 4:14

Personnel
John Martyn - acoustic guitar, Mutron guitar, vocals
Peter Erskine - conga
Ari Brown - tenor saxophone on "Go Down Easy"
Steve Eisen - alto flute
John Giblin - double bass on "Back to Marseille", guitar on "Goodnight Irene"
Nick McCabe - guitar on "Walking Home"
Andy Sheppard - tenor and soprano saxophones
Mavis Staples - vocals on "Goodnight Irene"
Jim Tullio - acoustic guitar, percussion, keyboards, fretless bass on "Go Down Easy"
Tony Peers - trumpet on "Ghosts"
Greg Marsh - drums, percussion
Paul Burn - drums on "One for the Road"
John Rice - mandolin on "Baby Come Home"
Scott Steiner - Hammond organ
John Scully - keyboards on "My Creator"
Kahil El'Zabar - percussion on "Go Down Easy"
Spencer Cozens - organ, piano
Paul Mertens - bass harmonica on "Baby Come Home"
Fred Nelson - piano
Paul Weller -  acoustic guitar, Wurlitzer electric piano, Hammond B3 organ, backing vocals on "Under My Wing" 
Chris "Hambone" Cameron - Fender Rhodes on "Go Down Easy"
Danny Thompson - double bass
Alan Thomson - fretless bass
The bass line on "My Creator" is a combination of parts recorded by Danny Thompson, Alan Thomson and John Giblin

External links
John Martyn's Website

2004 albums
John Martyn albums
Independiente Records albums